The 1958 Syerston Avro Vulcan crash was an aviation accident that occurred in England on 20 September 1958 during an air show at RAF Syerston, Nottinghamshire when a prototype Avro Vulcan bomber crashed. All four crew on board and three people on the ground were killed.

Flight
VX770 was the first prototype Vulcan. It had first flown with Avon engines, and had later been fitted with Sapphires. More recently, it had been fitted with Rolls-Royce Conway engines; on the day of the accident it was flying from the Rolls-Royce airfield at Hucknall to test the Conways. The four crew on board included a flight test engineer from Avro. During the course of the test-flight VX770 diverted to RAF Syerston to participate in the Battle of Britain day air show.

Accident
The Vulcan flew along runway 07 then started a rolling climb to starboard. During this manoeuvre the starboard wing disintegrated, resulting in a collapse of the main spar and wing structure. The Vulcan went into a dive with the starboard wing on fire and struck the ground. Three occupants of a controllers' caravan were killed by debris, all four of the Vulcan crew were also killed. Three servicemen who were in an ambulance were also injured by debris from the crash.

Cause
The official primary cause for the accident was a gross structural failure of the aircraft's main spar, which was confirmed by amateur footage, photographs and eyewitness accounts. The reason for the failure was not determined by the Board of Inquiry (BoI), but it was suggested by an accident investigator called in by Rolls-Royce that the main cause was that the pilot, upon performing the planned aerobatic display, exceeded the prototype's briefed speed and turning rate limits.
The accident investigator submitted a statement to the BoI, but did not give evidence under oath. The BoI was apparently not informed that the aircraft manufacturer considered the basis for the statement to be invalid.
The Technical Officer of the Board of Inquiry identified a suspected fatigue failure of the inboard arm of the front bottom wing attachment main forging, and suggested vibration from the high airflow volumes required by the RR Conway 11 engines as a possible cause.
The Royal Aircraft Establishment carried out a structural analysis of the wreckage and produced a report on 21 April 1960, but no copy has been found in the public record.
Avro's then Chief Test Pilot, Tony Blackman, argued that the maintenance crew failed to properly inspect the aircraft for known issues with stress damage to the aircraft's leading edges and structural ribs, which had been observed in another prototype he had flown earlier.

Notes

Bibliography
 
 Vulcan Mk 1, VX770: RAF Syerston, Notts, 20 Sept. 1958 Official incident report at The National Archives

External links
 Witness recalls the day a Vulcan bomber crashed at an airshow in Nottinghamshire, killing 7 people, 5 July 2020
 "Anniversary of Vulcan crash" BBC News, 19 September 2008.
  Aviation Safety Network accident report

Aviation accidents and incidents in England
Accidents and incidents involving Royal Air Force aircraft
Aviation accidents and incidents in 1958
1958 in England
Aviation accidents and incidents involving the Avro Vulcan
September 1958 events in the United Kingdom
Aviation accidents and incidents caused by in-flight structural failure